Liviu Cornel Babeș (10 September  1942 Brașov – 2 March 1989 Brașov) was a Romanian electrician and painter who committed suicide by self-immolation as a political protest.

Death
On 2 March 1989 Babeș set himself on fire on the Bradu ski slope at Poiana Brașov as a sign of protest against the communist regime. He left the message: „Stop Mörder! Brașov = Auschwitz". He was taken to the Brașov county hospital, where he died two hours later.

In Romania, according to Law no. 93, on 3 June 2007, Liviu Cornel Babeș was declared a hero.

Place names
 A street in Brașov has been named after him.

See also
 Brașov Rebellion
 Jan Palach
 Jan Zajíc
 Ryszard Siwiec
 Romas Kalanta
 Oleksa Hirnyk
 Alain Escoffier
 
 Kostas Georgakis
 List of political self-immolations

Notes

External links
 Brașoveanul care și-a dat foc în ’89 rămîne în anonimat -- Cotidianul, 2 martie 2007
 Liviu Babeș, comemorat la Poiana Brașov
 Două decenii de uitare - Eroul de la Brașov

1942 births
Eastern Orthodox Christians from Romania
Painters who committed suicide
People from Brașov
Romanian activists
Romanian human rights activists
Members of the Romanian Orthodox Church
Romanian revolutionaries
Self-immolations in protest of the Eastern Bloc
Suicides in Romania
20th-century Romanian painters
1989 suicides